Elongation factor 1-gamma is a protein that in humans is encoded by the EEF1G gene.

Function 

This gene encodes a subunit of the elongation factor-1 complex, which is responsible for the enzymatic delivery of aminoacyl tRNAs to the ribosome. This subunit contains an N-terminal glutathione transferase domain, which may be involved in regulating the assembly of multisubunit complexes containing this elongation factor and aminoacyl-tRNA synthetases.

Interactions 

EEF1G has been shown to interact with:

 EEF1B2, 
 EEF1D, 
 HARS, 
 LZTS1, 
 LARS, and
 RECQL5.

References

Further reading